Tirumala Rama idol is one of the deities in the Tirumala Venkateswara Temple, Andhra Pradesh. While the temple is dedicated to worship of lord Vishnu as Venkateswara, it contains the idols of some of Vishnu's other avatars: Rama and Krishna. The idol is usually accompanied by his consort Sita and his brother Lakshmana.

Legend of the idols
The Vasishta Ramayana relates that Sri Rama appeared to Sage Viswambara on the banks of as the Vaigai river. The sage was performing penance to get a vision of Sri Rama. In his vision, Rama and Lakshmana are seen with their bows in a standing posture, talking to Sugriva, Angada and Hanuman. The vision depicts the act of Rama granting protection to Vibhishana, brother of Ravana. Rama tells his monkey-king friend Sugriva that he was granting protection to Vibishana as well as extending his friendship to the Lanka prince. In the vision, Sugriva is seen with folded hands praying to Rama to reconsider his decision, reminding that Vibishana was Ravana's brother and Rama was accepting "the deadly enemy's brother" as a friend. Hanuman is seen with his right hand covering his mouth, in a stance of paying respect to Sri Rama. The monkey-prince Angada is seen pointing his finger towards the southern sky indicating the arrival of Vibhishana.

Having seen this vision, Sage Viswambara orders for the panchaloha idols of Rama and Lakshmana with the idols of Sugriva, Hanuman and Angada in the same postures as seen in his vision and installed these idols on the banks of the river and worshiped them. After being worshiped for a long time in that place, Sri Rama appeared in the dream of a devotee asking him to take the idols to Tiruvengadam (then the name of Tirumala) as the Vaigai city was experiencing strife and unrest. The idols were brought to the foothills of Tiruvengadam and shown to Ramanuja and Tirumalai Nambi who were studying the Ramayana at that time. In an act considered divine coincidence, Ramanuja and Tirumala Nambi were studying the chapter of the epic related to Vibhishana seeking refuge with Sri Rama, who accepts him against the wishes of Sugriva and others.

Ramanuja and Tirumala Nambi were struck at the coincidence and decided to make an idol of Sita. After performing the ritual of celestial marriage between Rama and Sita, the idols were installed in the newly constructed hall, Ramar Medai (Rama's elevated platform) in the Tirumala temple.

Rama idol
The idol of Lord Rama in Tirumala is referred to as Sri Raghunatha, Lord of Raghu (clan). Lord Rama is seen in a stanaka (standing pose) and is described as being in the madhyama tala and tribhanga pose. The left arm of the idol is raised to hold his bow and the right arm slopes downwards to hold the arrow. The face is tilted to the right side slightly and is capped by a crown that accentuates the tilt. The feet are set wide on a lotus pedestal with the left foot overshooting it.

The idol is usually seen with a bow in the left hand of the Lord and a crescent end arrow in the right arm. The bow is curved  at the edges and on the top side has five bells.

Sita idol
The idol of Sita is always seen on the right hand side of Lord Rama. The idol rests on a lotus pedestal and has the right arm by the side and the left arm holding a lotus bud. The idol of Sita does not have a crown.

Lakshmana idol
The idol of Lakshmana is always placed on the left hand side of Rama. The idol is a smaller but mostly similar replica of Lord Rama. While the posture (madhyama tala and tribhanga pose) is similar to his elder brother, the idol differs from Lord Rama in a few ways. The head is held erect and is not tilted. The feet are set closer to each other and rests fully on the pedestal. The idol is seen with the head slightly bent downwards, as mark of respect to his elder brother.

Hanuman deity

The deity of Hanuman is usually kept sideways on to the right side of Lord Rama. The idol stands on a pedestal and has Rama's favorite disciple in a wide-eyed expression indicating his ever-present enthusiasm to serve his Lord. In addition, the right hand is bent at the elbow and touches the mouth in a posture than conveys Hanuman's mark of respect for Rama. The left hand is in the Katyavalambita pose (left palm closed and resting on the waist and the outer side of the palm is seen to the onlookers)

Deity history
There are no records on the exact date when the idol was consecrated but the earliest record of the deities in any inscription dates to 1476 A.D. However, it is widely agreed that the idols might have been installed Ramarmedai (Rama Hall) was built in 1245 A.D. and hence the name of the room.

A different school of thought believes that the idols were installed by Sri Ramanuja.

Seva to idols

The idol of Sri Raghunatha does not receive main attention in the daily prayers of the temple. Even the daily naivedyam to the idol is offered to the main deity before attributing it to the Rama idol. The same practice is followed for the Krishna idol in the temple. During the annual Koil Alwar Thirumanjanam (cleansing of the temple), the idols are removed from the garbha griha (sanctum sanctorum) and replaced after the place is cleaned and consecrated with holy spices.

The Rama idol receives direct offerings outside the garbha griha  on occasions.
 Teppotsavam: During the annual Teppotsavam (float festival), the first day is dedicated to the idols of Lord Rama. The idols are brought to the Swami Pushkarini (holy lake to the north of the temple) and taken on a float to the mandapam in the middle of the lake for prayers.
 Vasanthotsavam: During the annual festival, the idols of Lord Rama, Sita, Lakshmana and Hanuman join Malayappa swami and consorts and Krishna idol on the third day on a procession around the four streets surrounding the temple and returned to the vasanta mandapam.
 Sri Rama Navami (Rama's birthday): In the morning, Snapana Thirumanjanam (turmeric abhshekam) is performed to the deities. After special prayers, the idols of Lord Rama, Sita, Lakshmana are bought on a procession on the Hanuman vahanam around the temple to mark the celebration of Rama Navami. After the completion of the procession, Purana Pravachanam (reading the history and lineage) is performed in the sanctum sanctorum outside the Bangaru Vakili (golden gate). On the day after Rama Navami, Sri Rama Pattabhishekam (Coronation of Sri Rama as the King) is performed On Chaitra Shukla Dashami . SriRama Navami is also the Same Day as the Day Of Killing Demon Ravana and Successfully Returning Victorious Rama to Ayodhya With Sita, Lakshmana, Hanuma, Sugriva, Jambavantha, Angadha etc., from Completing his Exile Period and then Sri Rama's Coronation(Saamraajya Pattabhisekham) Ceremony took Place on the Following Day or very Next Day when returned from Exile On Chaitra Shukla Dashami, Pushya Constellation (Chaitra Shukla Dasami, Pushyami Constellation, the same Muhurtha kept for Rama’s Coronation which is given by Dasaratha and Vasista before SriRama’s 14 years of Exile, Padhuka Pattabhisekham [happened before Rama completing his exile time] done by Rama’s brother Bharatha, when then Ayodhya is ruled by his Padhuka or Rama shoes till the end of 14 years exile time period of Rama returning Ayodhya) which is on Darmaraja Dasami day after SriRama Navami day, Lord Rama and his virtues besides, his popular regime ‘Rama Raajyam' to mark DharmaRaja Dashami as part of Sri RamaNavami as 'Ramo Vigrahavan Dharmah' Which Means Rama is The Embodiment Of Dharma Or Dharma has taken a form of Ramachandrah, It is the Happiest and Unforgettable Day to Every Hindu.

References

Tirumala Venkateswara Temple
Tirumala Idols